Erasure is an English pop group.

Erasure may also refer to:

Arts and media
 Erasure (album), by the British group Erasure
 Erasure (artform), a form of found poetry created by erasing words from an existing text 
 Erasure (novel), by Percival Everett

Science and technology
 Erasure channel, a communication channel model wherein errors are described as erasures
 Erasure code, a forward error correction (FEC) code for the binary erasure channel
 Type erasure, a process by which explicit type annotations are removed from a program
 Zeroisation, a process of erasing sensitive data stored electronically by overwriting it

Other uses
 Erasure (heraldry), the removal of portions of charges in heraldry
 Social invisibility, the separation or systematic ignoring of a group of people
 LGBT erasure or queer erasure, the removal of evidence of LGBT groups or people and queerness
 Sous rature, or under erasure, a deconstructionist philosophical device developed by Heidegger and used by Derrida

See also
 Eraser (disambiguation)